Gloria de los Ángeles Hutt Hesse (born 31 January 1955) is a Chilean politician and journalist, militant from Political Evolution (Evópoli/EVOP), a conservative-liberal and centre-right party.

In October 2022 Hutt was elected president of Political Evolution. Within the party she is considered close to Ignacio Briones and more distant to the founding group of the party  which is more classically right-wing and includes Felipe Kast and Luciano Cruz-Coke.

In 1990s, she was the vice-president of CEMA Chile, organization linked to Lucía Hiriart, wife of General Augusto Pinochet.

References

External links
 

1955 births
Living people
Chilean people of Swiss-German descent
Pontifical Catholic University of Chile alumni
Georgetown University alumni
21st-century Chilean politicians
Evópoli politicians
Government ministers of Chile
Women government ministers of Chile
21st-century Chilean women politicians
People from Santiago